The Waterfront Commission of New York Harbor (WCNYH) is a regulatory agency in Port of New York and New Jersey in the United States. The bi-state agency was founded in 1953 by a Congressional authorized compact between New York and New Jersey "for the purpose of eliminating various evils on the waterfront in the Port of New York Harbor." Under statutory mandate, the mission of the commission is to investigate, deter, combat and remedy criminal activity and influence in the port district and also ensures fair hiring and employment practices. Since 2018, New Jersey has been attempting to withdraw from the pact.

History 
The commission was set up in August 1953 (a year before the movie On the Waterfront) to combat labor racketeering. The commission was initially created to combat unfair hiring practices on the waterfront in response to the growing number of crimes being committed there.

Division of Licensing and Employment Information Centers 
The Division of Licensing and Employment Information Centers is responsible for screening, registering, and licensing individuals who are interested in working at the dock. The commission is authorized to deny or revoke the registration or licenses of those who involve themselves in criminal activity.

Police Division

The WCNYH has its own police division (a.k.a. WCPD), with state-certified peace officers that provide law enforcement services to the WCNYH areas.

Operations
The Police Division operates in Manhattan and Brooklyn and has three offices, two in NY:

Broadway, N.Y.
Brooklyn, N.Y.

and one in NJ:

Port Newark/Elizabeth office.

The Waterfront Commission of New York Harbor cooperates with various state, federal, and local law enforcement authorities in pursuing investigations into waterfront-related crimes.

Investigations
The Waterfront Commission participated in the investigation of criminal activities by the leaders and members of the Gambino crime family and union leaders. Charges of racketeering conspiracy, extortion, theft of union benefits, mail fraud, false statements, loansharking, embezzlement of union funds, money laundering, and illegal gambling, dating back over three decades, were brought forth by the United States District Court for the Eastern District of New York in February 2008 against leaders of the Gambino crime family, their associates, and union officials. The Police Division utilizes numerous vehicles in its vehicle fleet, including marked police cars and trucks.

Equipment
WCPD uses marked police patrol cars (such as Ford Explorer), command centre vehicles and boats for water work.

Officers wear a darkblue NYC-style police uniform, with:

Eight-point peaked cap with cap-badge
Blue shirt
Blue trousers
Black boots
Blue jacket

It also includes a duty belt with equipment. 
Identification includes the WCPD patch on both sides of the upper garments and a WCPD shield (badge) on the left breast.

Ranks

Ranks include:

New York State Inspector General report 
On August 11, 2009, the New York State Inspector General Joseph Fisch issued a report of his two-year investigation of the Waterfront Commission. The report detailed extensive illegal, corrupt and unethical behavior on the part of Waterfront Commission staff. Following release of the report, the large majority of the commission's executive staff were fired, including the New Jersey Commissioner Michael J. Madonna (the New York Commissioner's seat was vacant at the time of the report's release, although the report faulted the actions of the former New York Commissioner, Michael C. Axelrod).

The report's existence was due, in part, to two whistleblowers, Kevin McGown and Brian Smith, who both resigned and have since filed a discrimination complaint against the agency.

New Jersey withdrawal from pact
In October 2014, the New Jersey Senate passed measure S-2277 which would direct the governor of New Jersey to withdraw from the bi-state compact and transfer the commission's oversight responsibilities in New Jersey to the state police. In May 2015, Governor Chris Christie conditionally vetoed S-2277 (and the corresponding bill A-3506 passed by the New Jersey General Assembly), citing his concerns that the state lacked the authority to withdraw from the compact and arguing that the solution should be to modify the operations of the commission to minimize interference with waterfront operations.

Among his final actions in January 2018 before leaving office, Christie signed legislation allowing the state to withdraw from the pact.

The Supreme Court has paused New Jersey's withdrawal from the compact creating the commission until it has addressed the merits of an injunction filed by the State of New York.

References

External links
Waterfront Commission of New York Harbor home page
Annual report, The Waterfront Commission of New York Harbor 1994–2003.
New York Times articles about WCNYH

Port of New York and New Jersey
United States interstate agencies
Specialist police departments of New York (state)
Specialist police departments of New Jersey
Law enforcement agencies of New York City
Government agencies established in 1953
1953 establishments in New York City
1953 establishments in New Jersey